Claire Monis (10 February 1922 – 25 October 1967) was a French singer, actress, and Lieutenant in the French resistance. She was a Holocaust survivor as a member of the Auschwitz Women's Orchestra. After WW2, Claire was a producer of movies and TV shows.

Family and childhood
Monis was born on 10 February 1922 in the 10th arrondissement of Paris. Her parents, Avroum (alias Albert) Monis, a theatre bellman, Klezmer clarinet and accordion player, a cabinet maker, and Suzanne Aisenstein, originally from Russia, emigrated to France beginning of the 20th century, fleeing the anti-Semitic pogroms in Russia. They married  on 7 May 1921 in the 18th arrondissement of Paris and obtained French citizenship in 1928 with their two daughters. The couple set up as furniture merchants with the sign "Aux Galeries Saint-Maur", which later became a cabinetmaking shop "Les Meubles Monis".

Singing career
In 1938, Monis won the "music-hall des jeunes", a competition organized by the French federation of communist youths, which led her to take part with Pierre Dac in the youth gala.

Monis sang in Parisian cabarets: with Jacques Pills at the cabaret "Chez Elle", at "La Boîte à Sardines"; described as a "swing singer", she hosted the evenings of the cabaret "Au Normandy". She also participated in the programme of the cabaret " L'Écrin ", 19 rue Joubert Paris 9e, with Léo Marjane, Jacqueline Figus and Jean Solar.

Resistance and deportation

She used her singing tour (song order and word changes) to inform her network.

She was arrested on 22 June 1942 at 6, place du Combat in Paris, and sent to Fresnes prison, then interned on 10 September 1942 at the Autun citadel in the Saône-et-Loire department.

She declared herself to be non-Jewish and tried in vain to obtain a Catholic baptism certificate. Still, the new director of the status of Jewish people (under the general commissariat for Jewish questions), Emile Boutmy, demanded her father's birth certificate, which was impossible to provide. As a result, Monis was classified as "100% Jewish", on 22 December 1943. She was sent to the Drancy camp where she left 100 francs at the Caisse des Dépôts et Consignation before being deported to Auschwitz by convoy no. 66 on 20 January 1944. She was 21 years old. She escaped the extermination after being recruited into the Auschwitz women's orchestra as a singer in the orchestra led by Alma Rosé. There she met other French women, including  and Fanny Ruback, who also survived. All the survivors were transferred on 31 October 1944 to the Bergen-Belsen camp, where they arrived on 2 November 1944. The camp was liberated on 15 April 1945 by the British army. Monis was repatriated by truck on 17 May 1945 to Paris. She obtained her certificate as part of the French Fighting Force with the rank of Lieutenant of the French Resistance.

After the war

Monis met Charles-Henri Kahn (1915-1999) in 1945 at a Gaullist rallye and married him in 1947 in the 8th arrondissement of Paris. From this marriage two children were born, one of whom was Philippe Kahn in 1952. They were separated in 1957 and divorced in 1961. Monis raised his son Philippe alone. He was granted the status of the "ward of the Nation", after her death, thanks to Monis"s anticipation.

Monis pursued her career as a violinist and singer (classical, klezmer, and jazz) and frequently received her friends from the Resistance (such as ) and musicians around the family piano. She played with Luis Mariano in 1948 in the operetta Andalousie by Francis Lopez at the Gaîté-Lyrique, and performed the role again in 1949 and 1950 in Lyon. Monis then became a producer at ORTF and Radio France.

Death
Monis was hit by a car in front of her parents' shop at 11 Rue du Faubourg du Temple, at 11th arrondissement of Paris. She died a few days later as a result of this accident, on 25 October 1967 at her home in the 16th arrondissement of Paris. She was buried on 27 October 1967 in the Parisian cemetery of Bagneux. The words "Mort pour la France" were added to her death certificate in 1977.

References

Further reading

Fania Fénelon and Marcelle Routier. Playing for Time.  Translated from the French by Judith Landry.  Atheneum New York 1977. .
 Eischeid, Susan."The Truth about Fania Fénelon and the Women’s Orchestra of Auschwitz-Birkenau". Stock, 1976 - then Palgrave MacMillan New York 2016. 
Fania Fénelon and Marcelle Routier. Sursis pour l'orchestre. Témoignage recueilli par Marcelle Routier.  Co-édition Stock/Opera Mundi. Paris 1976. .
Esther Bejarano and Birgit Gärtner. Wir leben trotzdem. Esther Bejarano--vom Mädchenorchester in Auschwitz zur Künstlerin für den Frieden.  Herausgegeben vom Auschwitz-Komitee in der Bundesrepublik Deutschland [We Live Nevertheless] e.V. Pahl-Rugenstein Verlag Bonn, 2007. 
Esther Bejarano, Man nannte mich Krümel. Eine jüdische Jugend in den Zeiten der Verfolgung.  Herausgegeben vom Auschwitz-Komitee in der Bundesrepublik e.V. Curio-Verlag Hamburg 1989. 
Richard Newman and Karen Kirtley, Alma Rosé. Vienna to Auschwitz. Amadeus Press Portland Oregon 2000. 
Anita Lasker-Wallfisch, Inherit the Truth. A Memoir of Survival and the Holocaust.  St. Martin's Press New York 2000. 
Gabriele Knapp, Das Frauenorchester in Auschwitz. Musikalische Zwangsarbeit und ihre Bewältigung. von Bockel Verlag Hamburg 1996. 
Violette Jacquet-Silberstein and Yves Pinguilly, Les sanglots longs des violons... Avoir dix-huit ans à Auschwitz. Publié par les éditions Oskarson (Oskar jeunesse) Paris 2007. Previously published with the title Les sanglots longs des violons de la mort. 
Jacques Stroumsa. Violinist in Auschwitz. From Salonica to Jerusalem 1913-1967.  Translated from German by James Stewart Brice. Edited by Erhard Roy Wiehn. Hartung-Gorre Verlag. Konstanz (mentions Julie Stroumsa)
Mirjam Verheijen. Het meisje met de accordion: de overleving van Flora Schrijver in Auschwitz-Birkenau en Bergen-Belsen. Uitgeverij Scheffers Utrecht 1994. 
Rachela Zelmanowicz Olewski. Crying is Forbidden Here! A Jewish Girl in pre-WWII Poland, The Women's Orchestra in Auschwitz and Liberation in Bergen-Belsen. Edited by Arie Olewski and his sister Jochevet Ritz-Olewski. Based on her Hebrew testimony, recorded by Yad-Vashem on 21 May 1984. Published at the Open University of Israel 2009. 
Helena Dunicz-Niwińska. "One of the Girls in the Band. The Memoirs of a Violinist from Birkenau". Auschwitz-Birkenau State Museum, 2021 .
Jean-Jacques Felstein. Dans l'orchestre d'Auschwitz - Le secret de ma mère. Auzas Éditions Imago Paris 2010. 
Bruno Giner. Survivre et mourir en musique dans les camps nazis.  Éditions Berg International 2011. 
Laurent Joly. "Vichy dans la "solution finale"". Editions Grasset et Fasquelle. .

External links
"The Girls in the Auschwitz Band". thegirlsintheauschwitz.band (names of band members and some information).
 

1922 births
1967 deaths
Women's Orchestra of Auschwitz members
World War II civilian prisoners
Auschwitz concentration camp survivors
Bergen-Belsen concentration camp survivors
Jewish women musicians
Jewish classical musicians
French Resistance members
20th-century French women singers